Paul Theodore Hellyer  (August 6, 1923 – August 8, 2021) was a Canadian engineer, politician, writer, and commentator. He was the longest serving member of the Queen's Privy Council for Canada at the time of his death.

Early life
Hellyer was born and raised on a farm near Waterford, Ontario, the son of Lulla Maude (Anderson) and Audrey Samuel Hellyer. Upon completion of high school, he studied aeronautical engineering at the Curtiss-Wright Technical Institute of Aeronautics in Glendale, California, graduating in 1941. While studying, he also obtained a private pilot's licence.

After graduation, Hellyer was employed at Fleet Aircraft in Fort Erie, Ontario, which was then making training craft for the Royal Canadian Air Force as part of Canada's war effort in World War II. He attempted to become an RCAF pilot himself, but was told no more pilots were necessary, after which he joined the Royal Canadian Artillery and served in Canada as a gunner for the duration of the war.

Hellyer earned a Bachelor of Arts from the University of Toronto in 1949.

Early political career

First elected as a Liberal in 1949 federal election in the riding of Davenport, he was the youngest person ever elected to that point in the House of Commons of Canada. He served a brief stint as Parliamentary Assistant to the Minister of National Defence. He was then named Associate Minister of National Defence in the cabinet of Prime Minister Louis St. Laurent. This post was short-lived, though, as Hellyer lost his seat when the St. Laurent government lost the 1957 election two months later.

Hellyer returned to parliament in a 1958 by-election in the neighbouring riding of Trinity, and became an opposition critic of John Diefenbaker's Progressive Conservative government.

Cabinet minister and Liberal leadership candidate
When the Liberals returned to power in the 1963 election, Hellyer became Minister of National Defence in the cabinet of Lester B. Pearson. This was the most significant period in Hellyer's political career. As Minister of Defence, he oversaw the drastic and controversial integration and unification of the Royal Canadian Navy, Canadian Army, and the Royal Canadian Air Force into a single organization, the Canadian Forces.

Hellyer contested the 1968 Liberal leadership election, placing second on the first ballot, but slipped to third on the second and third ballots, and withdrew to support Robert Winters on the fourth ballot, in which Pierre Trudeau won the leadership. He served as Trudeau's Transport Minister.

Politics 1969–1988
In 1969, Hellyer issued a major report on housing and urban renewal in which he advocated incremental reforms rather than new government programs. He called for greater flexibility in Canada's mortgage loan system, and encouraged corporate pension funds to invest more money in housing programs. His approach did not meet with universal acceptance. Some provincial and municipal governments were openly skeptical, and Heward Grafftey, a left-leaning Progressive Conservative with an interest in housing, called for a more radical approach.

Hellyer's report also called for the suspension of the "wholesale destruction of older housing" and for "greater selectivity... in the demolition of existing houses". Grand urban renewal projects would come to an end as a result of his Task Force. Hellyer resigned from the cabinet in 1969 over a dispute with Trudeau over the implementation of the housing program.

Hellyer sat in Parliament as an independent beginning in 1971. After his 1971 attempt to form a new political party, Action Canada, failed, Progressive Conservative leader Robert Stanfield invited him to join the PC caucus. He returned to prominence as an opposition critic and was re-elected in the 1972 election as a Progressive Conservative. He lost his seat, however, in the 1974 election.

Despite this loss, Hellyer contested the PC leadership election of 1976. His views were too right wing for most delegates, and alienated many Tories with a speech attacking Red Tories as not being "true conservatives". He finished a distant sixth of eight contestants on the second ballot; Joe Clark won the leadership.

Hellyer rejoined the Liberal Party in 1982, but remained mostly silent in politics. In 1988, he contested the Liberal nomination in the Toronto riding of St. Paul's, losing to Aideen Nicholson, who had defeated Hellyer 14 years previously when he was a Tory MP in the adjacent riding of Trinity.

Under Prime Minister Pierre Trudeau, he also served as Canada's only Senior Minister from April 1968 until 1969, when he resigned from the post.

Canadian Action Party
In 1997, Hellyer formed the Canadian Action Party (CAP) to provide voters with an economic nationalist option following the collapse of the National Party of Canada. Hellyer believed that both the Progressive Conservative and Liberal parties were embracing globalization, and that the New Democratic Party was no longer able to provide a credible alternative. CAP also embraced Hellyer's proposals for monetary reform: that the government should become more involved in the direction of the economy by gradually reducing the creation of private money and increasing the creation of public money from the current ratio of 5% public / 95% private back to 50% public and 50% private.

His party remained a little-noticed minor party, and Hellyer lost bids for a seat in the House of Commons of Canada in the 1997 and 2000 elections.

Following the 2000 election, and a resurgence for the New Democratic Party, Hellyer approached NDP leadership to discuss the possibility of merging the two parties into 'One Big Party'. This process was furthered by the passage of a unanimous motion at the CAP's convention in 2003.

In early 2004, after several extensions of the merger deadline, the NDP rejected Hellyer's merger proposal which would have required the NDP to change its name. Hellyer resigned as CAP leader, but remained a member of the party. Rumours that he might run for the NDP in the 2004 election proved to be unfounded.

Extraterrestrial intelligence claims
On June 3, 1967, Hellyer inaugurated an unidentified flying object landing pad in St. Paul, Alberta. The town had built it as its Canadian Centennial celebration project, and as a symbol of keeping space free from human warfare.

In early September 2005, Hellyer made headlines by publicly announcing that he believed in the existence of UFOs. On September 25, 2005, he was an invited speaker at an exopolitics conference in Toronto, where he told the audience that he had seen a UFO one night with his late wife and some friends. In 2007, the Ottawa Citizen reported that Hellyer was demanding that world governments disclose alien technology that could be used to solve the problem of climate change. In an interview with RT (formerly Russia Today) in 2014, Hellyer said that at least four species of aliens have been visiting Earth for thousands of years, with most of them coming from other star systems, although there are some living on Venus, Mars and Saturn’s moon.

Personal life
Hellyer was one of the earliest investors in the Toronto Sun in 1971. He also served as a syndicated columnist for the newspaper between 1974 and 1984. Hellyer died of complications from a fall at a hospital in Toronto on August 8, 2021, two days after his 98th birthday.

Hellyer resided in Toronto. He has three children and five grandchildren.

Books
Hellyer has written several books on Canada and globalization, including One Big Party: To Keep Canada Independent, in which he promoted the merger of the CAP, NDP, and various left-wing activists to save Canada from the effects of globalization, as well as possible annexation by the United States.

Agenda, a Plan for Action (1971)
Exit Inflation (1981)
Jobs for All: Capitalism on Trial (1984)
Damn the Torpedoes (1990)
Funny Money: A common sense alternative to mainline economics (1994)
Surviving the Global Financial Crisis: The Economics of Hope for Generation X (1996)
Evil Empire : Globalization's Darker Side (1997)
Stop: Think (1999)
Goodbye Canada (2001)
One Big Party: To Keep Canada Independent (2003)
A Miracle in Waiting (2010), update of Surviving the Global Financial Crisis
Light at the End of the Tunnel: A Survival Plan for the Human Species (2010)
The Money Mafia: A World in Crisis (2014)
Hope Restored: An Autobiography by Paul Hellyer: My Life and Views on Canada, the U.S., the World & the Universe (2018)
Liberation! The Economics of Hope (2020)

Electoral record 

Note: Canadian Alliance vote is compared to the Reform vote in 1997 election.

Archives 
There is a Paul Hellyer fonds at Library and Archives Canada.

See also
Committee on Monetary and Economic Reform
Disclosure (ufology)

References

External links

1923 births
2021 deaths
Defence ministers of Canada
Canadian Ministers of Transport
Royal Canadian Air Force personnel of World War II
Canadian non-fiction writers
Canadian columnists
Canadian nationalists
Liberal Party of Canada leadership candidates
Liberal Party of Canada MPs
Members of the House of Commons of Canada from Ontario
Members of the King's Privy Council for Canada
Members of the United Church of Canada
Progressive Conservative Party of Canada MPs
Progressive Conservative Party of Canada leadership candidates
Canadian Army personnel of World War II
Canadian military personnel from Ontario
People from Norfolk County, Ontario
Royal Regiment of Canadian Artillery personnel
University of Toronto alumni
Ufologists